Aaron Cawley (born 15 October 1999) is an Irish cricketer. He made his Twenty20 cricket debut for Munster Reds in the 2017 Inter-Provincial Trophy on 26 May 2017.

In December 2017, he was named in Ireland's squad for the 2018 Under-19 Cricket World Cup. In February 2021, Cawley was part of the intake for the Cricket Ireland Academy. He made his List A debut on 6 May 2021, for Munster Reds in the 2021 Inter-Provincial Cup.

References

External links
 

1999 births
Living people
Irish cricketers
Munster Reds cricketers